José Miguel Espinosa (born 31 October 1945) is a Spanish former freestyle swimmer who competed in the 1964 Summer Olympics.

References

1945 births
Living people
Spanish male freestyle swimmers
Olympic swimmers of Spain
Swimmers at the 1964 Summer Olympics
Mediterranean Games gold medalists for Spain
Mediterranean Games medalists in swimming
Swimmers at the 1967 Mediterranean Games